Jakob Óskar Sigurðsson (born 28 March 1964) is an Icelandic former handball player who competed in the 1984 Summer Olympics, in the 1988 Summer Olympics, and in the 1992 Summer Olympics.  He is currently the CEO of Victrex International, a major worldwide manufacturer of peek polymer.

References

1964 births
Living people
Jakob Sigurdsson
Jakob Sigurdsson
Handball players at the 1984 Summer Olympics
Handball players at the 1988 Summer Olympics
Handball players at the 1992 Summer Olympics